The 2022 Reliance Foundation Development League was the inaugural season of the Reliance Foundation Development League, the first developmental association football league organised by Reliance Foundation in technical support with AIFF. The season featured eight teams, each playing 7 matches during the season, which was held in Goa from 15 April to 12 May 2022. Bengaluru FC Reserves and Kerala Blasters Reserves were the champions and runners up of the season respectively with both the teams qualifying for the Next Gen Cup to be held in United Kingdom.

Background
In June 2021 it was proposed by the organisers of ISL after a meeting with the CEOs of all the ISL clubs, that a new developmental league, called Reliance Foundation Development League, would be introduced in 2022. This new league would consist of the youth and reserve teams of all the ISL clubs, with aim to develop young players as there has been limited number of competitions and leagues outside the ISL since the pandemic.

The inaugural season of the proposed two-month league will be held in Goa inside a bio-secure bubble between January and March, following the same medical and safety procedures for 2021–22 ISL season, but got postponed to April 15. The league was confirmed on 7 April 2022.

Format
The teams would predominantly feature U-21 players with few overage players allowed as well. Each team will play seven matches again each other on a single round basis. A total of 28 matches will be played.

Qualification
The top-two teams will play in the 2022 Next Gen Cup. Bengaluru FC and Kerala Blasters FC confirmed their top-two finish and qualified for the NextGen Cup.

League table

Matches

Matchday – 1

Matchday – 2

Matchday – 3

Matchday – 4

Matchday – 5

Matchday – 6

Matchday – 7

See also
Elite League

References

Reliance Foundation Development League
2021–22 in Indian football
Reliance Sports